The 1994 Deutsche Tourenwagen Meisterschaft was the eleventh season of premier German touring car championship and also ninth season under the moniker of Deutsche Tourenwagen Meisterschaft.  The season had ten rounds with two races each; two additional rounds were held outside Germany but these did not count towards the championship.

The winner was Klaus Ludwig in Mercedes C-Class V6 with 222 points.

Teams and drivers

Schedule and results

Drivers Championship standings

† Not classified in the championship due to only entering the non-championship events.

‡ Non-championship event.

Notes
 Points System: 20–15–12–10–8–6–4–3–2–1 for the Top 10 drivers in each race. No extra points awarded.

References

External links

Deutsche Tourenwagen Masters seasons
1994 in German motorsport